Care Bears Movie II: A New Generation is a 1986 animated musical fantasy film produced by LBS Communications and Nelvana. The third animated feature from Nelvana, it was directed by Dale Schott, written by Peter Sauder and produced by Nelvana's three founders (Michael Hirsh, Patrick Loubert and Clive A. Smith). It stars the voices of Alyson Court, Cree Summer, Maxine Miller and Hadley Kay. In the second film based on the Care Bears franchise, a character called The Great Wishing Star (voiced by Chris Wiggins) tells the origins of the Care Bears, and the story of their first Caring Mission. True Heart Bear and Noble Heart Horse lead the other Care Bears and Care Bear Cousins, as they come to the aid of Christy, a young camper who is tempted by an evil shape-shifting figure named Dark Heart. This is also the first appearance of the Care Bear Cubs, who also had their own line of toys.

A New Generation was made over a seven-month period at Nelvana's Toronto facilities, with additional work handled by Taiwan's Wang Film Productions, and involved several crew members who had worked on the original Care Bears Movie. Patricia Cullen served as composer, and Los Angeles musicians Dean and Carol Parks worked on the film's six songs. The Samuel Goldwyn Company, the US distributor for the first film, was originally set to release the sequel, but demands from the film's producers caused the company to give up. The worldwide distribution rights were then acquired by Columbia Pictures.

Upon its release in March 21, 1986, A New Generation was criticized for its unnecessary merchandising tie-ins, poor animation quality, and frightening themes plotting onto a children's movie. Some of its key elements received comparisons to the German legend Faust and J. M. Barrie's Peter Pan. The film grossed only $8.5 million in North America, about a third of what the previous installment earned, and over $12 million worldwide. It was released on video in August 21, 1986, and the final home media release to date was a DVD issued in April 2003. The film was followed by The Care Bears Adventure in Wonderland in 1987.

Plot
Before the events of The Care Bears Movie, somewhere out on the ocean, a yellow bear and a purple horse which live in a giant ship, look after a pack of baby animals known as the Care Bear Cubs and Care Bear Cousin Cubs. During their journey, a Red Sea serpent threatens them. It is revealed to be one of the many forms of Dark Heart, an evil shape-shifting mist that brings chaos to the land. They escape by following a rainbow up to the sky, while the boat transforms into the Cloud Clipper. Once taking the stranded rainbow, they reach the Great Wishing Star. This spirit gives the group their iconic "symbols", pictures that indicate each creature's role or specialty, which are attached to their chests. True Heart Bear and Noble Heart Horse, as the characters are named, become founders of the Kingdom of Caring, a land which comprises Care-a-Lot and the Forest of Feelings.

For the Bears' first Caring Mission, True Heart and one of the cousins: Swift Heart Rabbit travel to Earth, where they are led to a children's summer camp. At the camp, they meet three of its participants: a kind and heartwarming young girl named Christy, and her best mates, the twins John and Dawn. Christy and the twins are concerned because a boastful boy nicknamed the "Camp Champ" always emerges victorious in showdowns. They decide to confront him, only for him to assign them to trash duty. A distraught Christy resolves to run away with her friends, only to get lost in the nearby forest all alone. True Heart soon finds John and Dawn. Not knowing what to do with them, True Hearts rescues them from the forest's outskirts and brings them to the Kingdom of Caring. After they arrive, the children hear a bell toll from the Caring Meter, which tells the Bears how much caring is taking place on Earth. Noble Heart and True Heart tell them to babysit the Cubs, before they leave to search for Dark Heart and Christy.

Meanwhile, in the forest, Christy meets Dark Heart (disguised as a human boy) for the first time, and asks him to make her the new Camp Champ. He grants her that wish, warning her she must pay him back with one favor with no questions asked, and walks away while she finally encounters his mates. Aware of Dark Heart's potential, True Heart and Noble Heart take action by moving the Bear Cubs to Care-a-Lot, and the Cousin Cubs to the Forest of Feelings. Both sets quickly grow up to become the Care Bear Family.

Later, while the Bears and cousins decide to celebrate the Kingdom of Caring's anniversary and prepare a party for the Kingdom's founders, Dark Heart sneaks into Care-a-Lot disguised as a repairman so that he can capture the whole Family. A cluster of Star Buddies, an army of stars which act as a defense to the kingdom (under the command of the Great Wishing Star), drives him off; he then morphs into a raging red cloud of mists and engage in a decisive battle. The Bears shoot light at him from their bellies, forming their "Care Bear Stare"; the Cousins also help by using their "Care Cousin Call". After Dark Heart is fended off, True Heart and Noble Heart decide to search and annihilate him, and leave the Bears to handle the missions all by themselves.

During their patrol, the Bears and Cousins spot Christy stranded in a canoe within a lake, but before they can rescue her, Dark Heart appears again as an aura of mist and shoots cursed bolts before the team. The family decides to retaliate, only to be captured by his evil red magic and being trapped into his magic bag, which was the favor he wanted Christy to do all along. The few Family members at hand determine that she has teamed up with him. This prompts Tenderheart Bear to hold a press wheel in the Hall of Hearts. John and Dawn join the conference after Friend Bear and Secret Bear saved them from a moose that was under Dark Heart's influence, to listen to Tenderheart Bear discuss his plans to successfully put down Dark Heart.

Later in the night, Dark Heart brainwashes everyone staying at the camp, causing them to wreak havoc around the zone. The Bears and Cousins search for any stranded Family members, and to engage Dark Heart again, only for Dark Heart to imprison them—first in cages, then freezing them inside big rubies hanging from a chandelier. Meanwhile, John and Dawn tell Christy of their conviction to rescue the Family from the evil entity. Feeling guilt, she finally comes to her senses and pays him back by admitting what she has done. Despite this, her bargain with Dark Heart is over, and finally admits that he must be expelled once and for all.

True Heart, Noble Heart (whom Dark Heart tricked into leaving the family alone while chasing his shadow), John and Dawn partake in a heist to reach and completely destroy Dark Heart inside his lair. After sending Grumpy Bear and other two mates in an attempt to steal a necklace with a key, Dark Heart awakens, revealing his mystical power. Christy soon joins the heist and threatens Dark Heart to bring the bears down. He refuses, and shows Christy the chandelier in which the Family is trapped. After an argument with Christy, Dark Heart warns her that if she saved his life, she should run and save hers, before finally shooting large bolts of red magic into True Heart and Noble Heart. Both confront the evil entity, which transforms again into an aura of red magic. Christy wants a ceasefire and attempts to intervene, only to be killed by one of Dark Heart's bolts of lightning. Christy flicks a marble into a lever holding the chandelier before dying. When the chandelier breaks, the family confronts the antagonist one final time, which soon retaliates by firing bolts of curse to the family yet again. Thinking that he is almost rid of everyone, he looks at Christy, which in her voice, tells him that be it good or bad, he is still a human. Dark Heart flies to her and repents for killing her.

Dark Heart's evil magic finally turns off forever and begs the family to bring her back to life. In a ritual meant to resurrect her, Dark Heart finally opens his mind and stops calling himself Dark Heart, while he chants that he cares about Christy along the others. Christy comes back to life, and due to Dark Heart's magic perishing, his own lair collapses. After a successful escape, Dark Heart finally is set free from the dark magic, and finally turns into a human, much to everyone's delight.

After a large celebration, the bears bid farewell to the campers, returning to their promises land. The Great Wishing Star finally delivers an ending speech, which is followed by Harmony Bear and Brave Heart paddling a rowboat past the castle that they raised at and flashbacks of the family's childhood across their promised kingdom.

Cast

Production

Development
The Care Bears franchise was created in 1981 by Those Characters from Cleveland, a division of the greeting card company American Greetings. Early in their tenure, the characters appeared as toys from the Kenner company, and also in greeting cards by Elena Kucharik. They starred in two syndicated television specials from a Canadian animation studio, Atkinson Film-Arts of Ottawa: The Care Bears in the Land Without Feelings (1983) and The Care Bears Battle the Freeze Machine (1984). After the specials, Toronto's Nelvana studio produced the first Care Bears Movie in less than eight months. It was distributed in the United States by The Samuel Goldwyn Company, an independent outfit, and grossed US$22.9 million at the North American box office, the largest amount for a non-Disney animated film at the time. This success guaranteed production of a second film, which was in consideration by May 1985. As with the original, production took place at Nelvana's facilities and Taiwan's Wang Film Productions; the Canadian studio also hired South Korean personnel to handle inking and painting. This time, over one hundred Nelvana animators worked on the film over a seven-month period that lasted until February 1986; the company itself received credit for the story development. American Greetings and Kenner commissioned Nelvana to make the sequel on contract; television syndicator LBS Communications, a co-financier of the first one, became the producer and presenter.

Care Bears Movie II was Nelvana's third animated feature film, after 1983's Rock & Rule and The Care Bears Movie. It marked the directorial debut of Dale Schott, a Nelvana staff member who served as assistant director on the first Care Bears Movie, as well as the Nelvana/Lucasfilm TV series Ewoks. Several other crewmembers from the first film returned to the fold; Nelvana's founders (Michael Hirsh, Patrick Loubert and Clive A. Smith) served as producers, while Peter Sauder wrote the screenplay and Charles Bonifacio handled animation duties. Jack Chojnacki, the co-president of American Greetings' licensing division Those Characters from Cleveland, served once again as an executive producer. A roster of Toronto voice actors—among them Cree Summer, Sunny Besen Thrasher, Dan Hennessey and Hadley Kay—appeared in this follow-up. Mickey Rooney and Georgia Engel, who appeared in the first film, did not return.

At one point, The Samuel Goldwyn Company was about to release A New Generation, but lost the distribution rights after turning down demands from the producers. Eventually, Nelvana went into negotiations with Columbia Pictures, which acquired worldwide theatrical rights in early 1986. This led founder Samuel Goldwyn Jr. to remark: "The fact that Columbia is distributing the Care Bears sequel is typical of the greed of the big studios. Someone else has to go in and prove something works, then a studio will charge in." By contrast, Goldwyn acquired the rights to the original film after major U.S. studios passed on it; they did not see the financial potential in a movie aimed strictly for children.

Allusions

According to Richard Freedman of the Newhouse News Service, "This must be the first version of the Faust myth in which not only does Faust (or Faustina [Christy], here) manage to weasel out of the pact with the Devil, but succeeds in regenerating him, as well." Elliot Krieger of Rhode Island's Providence Journal also took note of such a theme, headlining his review "Faust goes to summer camp". In regards to continuity issues, a reviewer in The Scarecrow Movie Guide observed a "montage showing the Care Bears and their Cousins growing up together from infancy to full Care Bear maturation—nullifying everything that happened in the first movie". Mike McLane of Florida's Gainesville Sun gave a few suggestions of the storyline's possible religious subtext. He compared the Great Wishing Star to God, the Bears' "beautiful cloud kingdom" of Care-a-Lot to Heaven, and Dark Heart to Satan; he also hinted that the Bears protected humankind like angels did.

Charles Solomon pointed out that the film's climax, in which the Bears help revive Christy, "borrows...flagrantly from Peter Pan". The Scarecrow contributor took note of this aspect, writing, "There's an excruciating scene where the Care Bears turn to the audience and plead for help in the form of excessive and focused caring." In his critique, Hal Lipper called it the "Tinker Bell Principle", whereupon the audience must come together to save a dying character. In Vincent Canby's opinion, the Great Wishing Star "looks like Tinker Bell if she were a star-shaped beanbag".

Music

As with the original film, Patricia Cullen composed the score for Care Bears Movie II. The soundtrack album was released in LP format by Kid Stuff Records. Los Angeles musicians Dean and Carol Parks were credited as producers, writers and performers of the film's six songs, which were included on the album. Stephen Bishop, performer of the Oscar-nominated "It Might Be You" from Tootsie, and Debbie Allen from the TV series Fame, were on hand as vocalists. John Braden arranged and edited the album.

The Parks recorded their contributions to the project at their home. At the time of production, they shared their experiences of working on the soundtrack:

Paul Attanasio of The Washington Post gave a mixed response to the film's music. "The songs are dopey," he said, "but the score [...], which is mostly seven kinds of sprightly, has its occasional moments." Vincent Canby wrote in his review, "[There are] unseen loudspeakers [that] pour out a nonstop Hit Parade of songs to be interred by, including 'I Care for You,' 'Our Beginning' and 'Forever Young. But Joe Fox of The Windsor Star recommended it, adding, "[W]henever things start to drag a snappy tune comes along to get everyone interested."

Release

North America
Initially intended for a mid-year release, Care Bears Movie II opened on March 7, 1986, in the U.S. and Canada, grossing US$243,161 from 55 theatres, and US$449,649 by its first few days. At this stage, it managed to rank above a reissue of Disney's 1959 production Sleeping Beauty, which also premiered that same weekend. However, when the final weekend box office results were announced Sleeping Beauty outgrossed Care Bears II by $59,000. Its wide-release opening on March 21 brought in $2.5 million from 1,446 theatres, placing seventh on the box office chart. Over the next two weekends, it earned little more than $1 million in 12th place. During release, it faced competition from another toy-based film, Atlantic Releasing's GoBots: Battle of the Rock Lords. At the time A New Generation opened, Richard Martin of the Ottawa Citizen commented: "... The first Care Bears movie has become the most successful non-Disney animated feature ever. This second movie from Nelvana could very well surpass that record, since it held the attention of all but the youngest members of the first-night audience and even has something to offer adults." Ultimately, this installment earned US$8,540,346 in North America—about a third of what the previous one earned; over US$1 million of this total came from Canada. By 1988, it made over US$12 million worldwide.

Overseas
Care Bears Movie II made its debut in the United Kingdom, via Columbia-EMI-Warner Distributors, on July 25, 1986; it later appeared on home video in that country under the RCA/Columbia Pictures and Video Collection International labels. Warner-Columbia Film of France released it on April 8, 1987 as Les Bisounours II—Une nouvelle génération; publishing rights were held by Hachette Livre. It was released in the Netherlands on April 9, 1987, as De Troetelbeertjes Deel 2: Nieuwe Avonturen Van De Troetelbeertjes. The film is also known as Gli orsetti del cuore II in Italy, and Krambjörnarna: på nya äventyr in Sweden.

The Warner-Columbia branch in West Germany released it under the title Glücks-Bärchis, Teil 2—Jetzt im Abenteuerland (Care Bears lucky, Part 2 Now in Adventureland) on December 11, 1986. By comparison, Filmwelt's release of the first film that same year placed 47th with 538,487 tickets. On October 13, 1987, RCA/Columbia Pictures released the local version of Care Bears Movie II on video.

The film was released in Mexico on December 25, 1986, as Los Ositos Cariñositos II, and on April 3, 1987 in the Philippines. By the early 1990s, it was marketed as Ursinhos Carinhosos II in Brazil. In China, it is known under the title of Baby Love Bears. In Russia, the movie was distributed under several names, such as Wonder Bears: The New Generation, in a more corresponding translation to the original and other. In Japan, the film was released direct to video through the VHS market on November 21, 1990, under the title Little Bears of the Fairy Star. Subtitled and dubbed versions have been released.

Reception

Critical response

The film was lambasted by critics, in part because of their theory that Care Bears Movie II: A New Generation was part of the franchise's marketing scheme at the time of release. This led The New York Times' Vincent Canby to begin his review by proclaiming, "Product merchandising marches on." Another reviewer claimed to have seen almost every collectible within the film's first twenty minutes. The film was produced to serve as the franchise introduction of the Care Bear Cubs and the Care Bear Cousin Cubs, who also had their own line of toys from Kenner. The plushes, measuring 11" in height, consisted of Bedtime Cub, Cheer Cub, Funshine Cub and Share Cub; the line of Care Bear Cousin Cubs included Li'l Bright Heart Raccoon, Li'l Proud Heart Cat and Li'l Swift Heart Rabbit. Kenner announced the introduction of the Cubs in 1985, shortly before the film opened, and showcased them at the American International Toy Fair in February 1986.

In The Motion Picture Guide 1987 Annual, Jay Robert Nash wrote that its title "refers to the new featured characters who, more than coincidentally, have ended up on the toy shelves of stores everywhere." Steve Millburg from the Omaha World-Herald, however, found it misleading and complained that the Cubs "are not 'a new generation' at all". Several critics considered the film a prequel to the original: the Omaha World Herald reviewer; Edward Jones of Virginia's The Free Lance-Star; Charles Solomon of the Los Angeles Times; and Bill Cosford of The Miami Herald. According to Michael H. Price of the Fort Worth Star-Telegram, "Care Bears Movie II is what the film industry calls a 'requel,' tracing the origin of the Care Bear family and relatives of other species."

In his Animated Movie Guide, animation expert Jerry Beck gave Care Bears Movie II a half-star (½) out of four, and offered this consensus:

John Stanley expressed his views likewise in his 1988 film guide, Revenge of the Creature Features:

"Care Bears Movie II is a sort of pre-sequel that, I suspect, requires its audiences to have some prior knowledge of Care Bears," Vincent Canby said in his New York Times review. "Very young kids may love this, but anybody over the age of 4 might find it too spooky." Hal Lipper of the St. Petersburg Times remarked that it "is an enormously engaging cartoon—quite a feat when you consider the saccharine psychobabble passing for dialogue". The Miami Herald's Bill Cosford gave it two and a half stars out of four, the same rating he had applied to its predecessor. Edward Jones commented that "The animation can't compare with the best of Disney. Take a look at Sleeping Beauty [...] and you'll see the difference." Likewise, Italian critic Paolo Mereghetti complained, "[This is an] ugly sequel with awkward animation, and not even the small fry will find it fun."

Charles Solomon said, "The new Care Bears film...is even more sloppily made and hawks its goods even more shamelessly. [...] The film makers seem more concerned with showcasing the toys than providing entertainment; shared profits obviously count for more than shared feelings. If someone started selling 'Hate Bears,' there undoubtedly would be a film about them." Gene Siskel awarded the film zero stars out of four  (along with "Thumbs Down" on At the Movies—the Siskel & Ebert TV show having not been introduced yet), while Leonard Maltin gave it a "BOMB" rating in his Movie Guide, and added: "Your kids deserve better entertainment than this treacly stuff about the Kingdom of Caring. Prefab animation from the era of toy merchandising tie-ins." The Gale Group publication, VideoHound's Golden Movie Retriever, gave it one bone out of four in its 1992 edition, but revised it to two later on. In 2001, the Los Angeles-based Hastings Bad Cinema Society picked A New Generation as one of The 100 Worst Movies of the 20th Century. "Even suffering through a Barney video would be preferable to sitting through this," said compiler Michael Lancaster. The film itself had also been nominated for Worst Picture back at their 1986 awards.Common Sense Media gave it slightly negative reviews, as the group responses "Young preschoolers may be frightened by this movie, which offers very little in the way of learning.". The group also aged this movie 6+, as the subplot is too dark for the Care Bears.

The film received some positive reviews, however. Writing for The Advocate of Baton Rouge, Louisiana, Norma Dyess Michaud deemed it "a must-see for preschoolers, especially those who are in the throes of the current Care Bear mania". Richard Martin praised the script and climax, along with the performances of the orphan Cubs. "Their pastel, birthday-cake-and-whipped-cream world has never looked sweeter," he stated. The Philadelphia Daily News commented that it was "even better than the first one, which was good".

Home media
Care Bears Movie II: A New Generation was released on VHS and Betamax by RCA/Columbia Pictures Home Video on August 21, 1986, and debuted in 12th place on Billboard's Top Kid Video Sales chart on September 27 that same year. The film aired during 1987 on the Disney Channel, a premium television station, and was broadcast in later years on CBS, HBO, Showtime and The Movie Channel. It returned on VHS as part of the Columbia TriStar Family Collection on August 13, 1996. Columbia TriStar Home Entertainment premiered it on DVD on April 8, 2003, as the film is digitally remastered with the picture and color enhanced. The only special features in this edition were trailers for several of the company's family-oriented titles. This was the last animated feature to be released by Columbia Pictures until Final Fantasy: The Spirits Within in 2001. As of 2018, there are consequently no plans for this prequel to be reissued on DVD, even a Blu-ray release has yet to occur. However, a widescreen version of this film (unlike the DVD release, which only contains the full screen version), is available to purchase on iTunes, Amazon Prime, and VUDU. The original theatrical trailer can be viewed in the iTunes Store.

Sequel
In 1987, Nelvana followed A New Generation with The Care Bears Adventure in Wonderland or The Care Bears Movie. In this third film, the Bears and Cousins travel to Wonderland and save its Princess from a wizard; Alice, a girl from the real world, takes her place. Self-financed by Nelvana and released by Cineplex Odeon Films, it was the last Care Bears movie of the 1980s to go into theatres. It grossed US$2.6 million in the North American market, and US$6 million worldwide by February 1988. The Care Bears would not appear in another feature production until 2004's direct-to-video effort, Care Bears: Journey to Joke-a-lot.

See also

 Canadian films of the 1980s
 List of Nelvana franchises
 List of animated feature-length films

Notes

References

External links

 
 
 
 Care Bears Movie II: A New Generation at Keyframe: The Animation Resource
 
 

1980s American animated films
1980s Canadian animated films
1980s children's animated films
1980s children's fantasy films
1980s English-language films
1980s fantasy adventure films
1980s musical films
1986 animated films
1986 directorial debut films
1986 films
American children's animated adventure films
American children's animated fantasy films
American children's animated musical films
American fantasy adventure films
American musical fantasy films
Animated films about bears
Animated films about orphans
Canadian animated fantasy films
Canadian musical films
Care Bears films
Child versions of cartoon characters
Columbia Pictures animated films
Columbia Pictures films
Films about shapeshifting
Films about summer camps
Nelvana films
Works based on Peter Pan
Works based on the Faust legend
English-language Canadian films
1980s Canadian films